What If? is an album by pianist Kenny Barron recorded in 1986 and released on the German Enja label.

Reception 

In his review on Allmusic, Greg Turner noted: "Long considered as one of the finest pianists in jazz, Barron's excellent composing skills are also evident on this worthy addition to his discography".

Track listing 
All compositions by Kenny Barron except where noted.

 "Phantoms" – 7:02
 "What If?" – 7:26
 "Close to You Alone" (Cecil McBee) – 5:58
 "Dexterity" (Charlie Parker) – 3:57
 "Voyage" – 5:03
 "Lullabye" – 7:09
 "Trinkle, Tinkle" (Thelonious Monk) – 5:43

Personnel 
Kenny Barron – piano
Wallace Roney – trumpet (tracks 1, 2, 5 & 6)
John Stubblefield – tenor saxophone (tracks 1, 2, 5 & 6)
Cecil McBee – bass (tracks 1-3, 5 & 6)
Victor Lewis – drums (tracks 1-6)

References 

Kenny Barron albums
1986 albums
Enja Records albums
Albums recorded at Van Gelder Studio